Marjan Amalietti (19 July 1923 - 1988) was a Slovene architect, also known for his illustrations, comics and caricatures.

Amalietti was born in Ormož in 1923. He studied architecture at what was then the Technical Faculty of the University of Ljubljana (now the Faculty of Civil Engineering and Geodesy) and graduated in 1954. From 1957 he also taught at the faculty. For many years his caricatures were regularly published in the satirical magazine Pavliha.
He also illustrated numerous children's books. In 1978 he won the Levstik Award for his illustrations of Netočka Nezvanova and Ulenspiegel (Netochka Nezvanova and Ulenspiegel).

Selected Illustrated Works

 Socializem v Kozji vasi (Socializm in Goatsville), written by Vid Pečjak, 1988
 Majhen človek na veliki poti (A Small Man on a Big Road), written by Vida Brest, 1983
 Deček na črnem konju (The Boy on the Black Horse), written by Leopold Suhodolčan, 1979
 Kaplan Martin Čedermac (Chaplain Martin Čedermac), written by France Bevk, 1978
 Potepuh in nočna lučka (The Vagabond and the Night Light), written by Svetlana Makarovič, 1977
 Maruška Potepuška (Maruška's Adventures), picture book without text, 1977
 Ulenspiegel (Ulenspiegel), written by Jiří Kolář, 1977
 Netočka Nezvanova (Netochka Nezvanova ), written by Fyodor Dostoyevsky, 1977

References

Slovenian architects
Slovenian illustrators
Slovenian cartoonists
Slovenian caricaturists
1923 births
1988 deaths
People from Ormož
Levstik Award laureates
University of Ljubljana alumni
Academic staff of the University of Ljubljana
20th-century Slovenian architects
Yugoslav architects
Yugoslav cartoonists